The 2004 Lexmark Indy 300 was the thirteenth and penultimate round of the 2004 Bridgestone Presents the Champ Car World Series Powered by Ford season, held on October 24, 2004 on the Surfers Paradise Street Circuit, Queensland, Australia.  Paul Tracy won the pole and Bruno Junqueira won the race.

Qualifying results

* Oriol Servià's time from Qualification Session #1 was forfeited after he switched to his backup car for the race.

Race

Caution flags

Notes

 New Race Record Bruno Junqueira 1:46:45.941
 Average Speed 89.532 mph

Championship standings after the race

Drivers' Championship standings

 Note: Only the top five positions are included.

References

External links
 Full Weekend Times & Results
 Friday Qualifying Results
 Saturday Qualifying Results
 Race Box Score

Lexmark Indy 300
Lexmark Indy 300
Gold Coast Indy 300